Willibald Kirbes (29 June 1902 – 3 February 1990) was an Austrian international footballer.

References

1902 births
1990 deaths
Association football forwards
Austrian footballers
Austria international footballers
SK Rapid Wien players
Place of birth missing